Meysey Hampton (also known as Maisey Hampton or Maiseyhampton) is a village and civil parish in Gloucestershire, England, approximately  to the south-east of Gloucester. It lies in the south of the Cotswolds, an Area of Outstanding Natural Beauty.

History

Toponymy
Meysey Hampton was listed as Hantone in the Domesday Book of 1086, derived from the Old English hām-tūn  meaning "home farm" or "homestead". It was recorded in 1287 as Meseishampton, this alteration showing the influence of a local family called de Meisi. By 1868, it was known as Meysey Hampton, with an alternative spelling of Maisey Hampton.

Governance
Meysey Hampton has a Parish Council, currently with 7 members. The current chair is local resident Roger Case.

As of May 2015 the village became part of 'The Ampneys and Hampton Ward' on Cotswold District Council. The current District Councillor is Liberal Democrat Lisa Spivey who was elected in the 2019 United Kingdom local elections.

Meysey Hampton is part of the wider South Cerney electoral division for elections to Gloucestershire County Council, Lisa Spivey who was elected in the 2021 United Kingdom local elections is also the County Councillor.

Geography
Meysey Hampton lies in the southern part of the Cotswolds, a range of hills designated an Area of Outstanding Natural Beauty. Villages nearby include Poulton, Ampney St. Peter, Ampney St. Mary, Down Ampney, Marston Meysey, Totterdown and Honeycombe Leaze.

Education
Meysey Hampton has one primary school; Meysey Hampton Church of England Primary School, a voluntary controlled school for children from the age of 5–11. In 2006, the school had 102 pupils.

Church

Meysey Hampton's church is dedicated to St. Mary. Consecrated in 1269, it is thought to have been financed by the Knights Templar. The chancel was enlarged in the 14th century.

References

Villages in Gloucestershire
Civil parishes in Gloucestershire
Cotswold District